Emily Rios (born April 27, 1989) is an American actress and model. She is best known for her role as Andrea Cantillo on the AMC series Breaking Bad. In 2013 she began portraying newspaper reporter Adriana Mendez on the FX series The Bridge. She also appeared as Lucía Villanueva in the FX drama Snowfall.

Early life
Rios is of Mexican descent and was raised as a Jehovah's Witness.

Career 
Rios was professionally discovered during a day out at a shopping mall. She appeared in the 2005 short film For Them and the 2006 film Quinceañera. In 2008, she appeared in the independent film Vicious Circle. She has also had recurring roles in the television series Friday Night Lights, Men of a Certain Age, Breaking Bad, The Bridge and From Dusk till Dawn: The Series. She portrays Lucia Villanueva, the daughter of a Mexican crime boss, on the drama Snowfall, which debuted on FX on July 5, 2017.

Personal life
Rios came out as a lesbian in 2014.

Filmography

Film

Television

References

External links 

Actresses from Los Angeles
American actresses of Mexican descent
American child actresses
American film actresses
American lesbian actresses
American television actresses
Hispanic and Latino American actresses
LGBT Hispanic and Latino American people
LGBT people from California
Living people
People from El Monte, California
People from West Covina, California
21st-century American actresses